Erythrina suberosa, the corky coral tree, is a species of flowering plant in the family Fabaceae. It is native to the Indian Subcontinent (except Assam), Southeast Asia (except Laos), and Peninsular Malaysia. Due to its showy flowers and habit of flowering most of the year, it is often planted as an ornamental or street tree. Although the flowers can be used to make a refreshing drink, the seeds are poisonous.

References

suberosa
Ornamental trees
Flora of the Indian subcontinent
Flora of Indo-China
Flora of Peninsular Malaysia
Plants described in 1832